Neal Steven Wolin (born December 9, 1961) is the CEO of the corporate advisory firm Brunswick Group, an equity partner of Data Collective, a board partner of Social Capital, and a limited partner advisor of Nyca Partners. He is the longest-serving Deputy Secretary of the U.S. Department of the Treasury and also served as Acting Secretary of the Treasury in early 2013.

In 2009, following eight years with The Hartford Financial Services Group, Wolin was appointed Deputy Secretary of the U.S. Department of the Treasury by President Barack Obama, where he led the U.S. government's financial reform plan during the Great Recession, including the Dodd-Frank Wall Street Reform and Consumer Protection Act. He resigned as Deputy Secretary in August 2013.

Wolin also served during the Clinton administration for eight years as general counsel, Deputy General Counsel of the Treasury, and as a staff member of the United States National Security Council.

Early life and education
Wolin was born and raised in Evanston, Illinois, where he graduated from Evanston Township High School in 1979. His father, Harry S. Wolin, was a lawyer; and his mother, Doris Wolin, was a former public school teacher. 
Graduated summa cum laude with a B.A. in history from Yale University, Wolin also served as president of the Yale Political Union. He then received a M.S. in Development Economics from Balliol College, Oxford, as a Charles and Julia Henry Fellow; and subsequently earned a J.D. from Yale University, where he was a Coker Teaching Fellow in Constitutional Law.

Career 

Following law school, Wolin served as a law clerk to U.S. District Judge Eugene Nickerson in Brooklyn, New York, and taught as an adjunct professor of law at Brooklyn Law School. Wolin also worked at the Washington, D.C. law firm of Wilmer, Cutler & Pickering.

From 1990 to 1993, Wolin served as Special Assistant to three Directors of Central Intelligence: William H. Webster, Robert Gates, and R. James Woolsey, Jr.

Clinton administration 

From 1993 to 1994, Wolin served as Deputy Legal Advisor to the National Security Council.

In 1994, Wolin became an executive assistant to National Security Advisor Anthony Lake and Deputy National Security Advisor Sandy Berger.

From 1995 to 1999, he served as the Deputy General Counsel of the Department of the Treasury, under Secretary Robert Rubin.

In November 1998, he was appointed to the President's Commission on Holocaust Assets in the United States.
             
From September 15, 1999 to January 20, 2001, Wolin served as General Counsel of the U.S. Department of the Treasury, under Secretary Lawrence Summers.

In January 2001, Secretary Summers presented Wolin the Alexander Hamilton Award, the highest honor awarded to a Treasury official.

In early 2001, Wolin was also visiting fellow in economic studies at the Brookings Institution, and an adjunct assistant professor at the Kennedy School of Government at Harvard University.

The Hartford 

In March 2001, Wolin joined The Hartford Financial Services Group as executive vice-president and general counsel, overseeing the company's legal and tax departments, government affairs, communications, and marketing functions. In 2007, he succeeded David K. Zwiener as president and COO of the company's property and casualty insurance subsidiaries.

Obama administration 

In February 2009, shortly after Barack Obama took office, Wolin returned to Washington, D.C. as Deputy Assistant to the President and Deputy Counsel to the President for Economic Policy.

In March 2009, he was nominated as Deputy Secretary of the United States Department of the Treasury by President Obama, then confirmed by the senate on May 18, 2009. Wolin served as United States Acting Secretary of the Treasury from January 25 to February 28, 2013, prior to the confirmation of Jack Lew, who was nominated by Obama to succeed Secretary Timothy Geithner.

Wolin was a "key architect" of U.S. financial reforms during the Great Recession, and was instrumental to the development and implementation of the Dodd-Frank Wall Street Reform and Consumer Protection Act. The Act aimed to upgrade "the foundation for a stronger financial system – 
closing regulatory gaps, increasing transparency for consumers, and strengthening prudential requirements,” including an annual “stress-test” by the Federal Reserve of the 33 banks designated as being “systemically important” to the U.S. economy.

From early 2009 until late 2013, during his tenure as Deputy Treasury Secretary, Wolin also chaired the Committee on Foreign Investment in the United States (CFIUS), which reviews, for national security reasons, any transaction that would result in a foreign entity having control over a U.S. asset.

In July 2011, Wolin was appointed to the Government Accountability and Transparency Board.

In January 2013, Wolin was awarded a second Alexander Hamilton Award by Secretary Timothy Geithner.

On July 22, 2013, President Obama officially announced Wolin’s retirement as Deputy Secretary at the end of August 2013, stating that “His deep knowledge and excellent judgment helped us prevent a second Great Depression, pass tough new Wall Street reform, strengthen our financial system, foster growth here at home, and promote economic development around the world.”

In August 2014, he was appointed to the President’s Intelligence Advisory Board, from which he later resigned on January 20, 2017.

Brunswick Group 

In February 2018, Wolin was appointed as CEO of the global corporate advisory firm Brunswick Group.

Board memberships and professional affiliations

Wolin is a member of the Council on Foreign Relations, and of the bars of Illinois, Connecticut, and the District of Columbia. Current affiliations include:

Member, Board of Overseers, RAND Institute for Civil Justice.

Board partner, Social Capital

Equity partner, Data Collective

Limited Partner Advisor, Nyca Partners

Board member, WAVE

Board member, SIGFIG

Board member, Appriss

Board member, Treliant

Board member, Partnership for Public Service

Board member, Atlantic Council

Advisor, Raptor Intelligence, Inc.

Advisor, Jupiter Intelligence

Advisor, Covr Advisory Board, Covr Financial Technologies, LLC

Personal life
In July 2001, he met Nicole Louise Elkon, who had also been on staff at the White House during the Clinton administration; the couple married at the Jewish Center of the Hamptons in East Hampton, New York.

References

External links

|-

|-

1961 births
21st-century American politicians
Alumni of Balliol College, Oxford
20th-century American Jews
Living people
Obama administration cabinet members
Obama administration personnel
People from Evanston, Illinois
United States Deputy Secretaries of the Treasury
Yale College alumni
Yale Law School alumni
Brooklyn Law School faculty
Acting United States Secretaries of the Treasury
21st-century American Jews